The 2nd constituency of Heves County is one of the single member constituencies of the National Assembly, the national legislature of Hungary. The constituency standard abbreviation: Heves 02. OEVK.

Since 2014, it has been represented by László Horváth of the Fidesz–KDNP party alliance.

Geography
The 2nd constituency is located in north-western part of Heves County.

The constituency borders with 3rd-, 4th- and 2nd constituency of Borsod-Abaúj-Zemplén County to the northeast, 1st constituency to the southeast, 3rd constituency to the south and 1st constituency of Nógrád County to the northwest.

List of municipalities
The constituency includes the following municipalities:

History
The 2nd constituency of Heves County was created in 2011 and contained of the pre-2011 abolished constituencies of 2nd and main part of 3rd constituency of this County. Its borders have not changed since its creation.

Members
The constituency was first represented by László Horváth of the Fidesz from 2014, and he was re-elected in 2018 and 2022.

Election result

2022 election

2018 election

2014 election

References

Heves 2nd